The State Register of Heritage Places is maintained by the Heritage Council of Western Australia. , 387 places are heritage-listed in the City of Kalgoorlie-Boulder, of which 62 are on the State Register of Heritage Places.

List
The Western Australian State Register of Heritage Places, lists the following 62 state registered places within the City of Kalgoorlie-Boulder:

References

Kalgoorlie
 
Kalgoorlie